The National Women's History Museum (NWHM) is a museum and an American history organization that "researches, collects and exhibits the contributions of women to the social, cultural, economic and political life of our nation in a context of world history." The NWHM was founded in 1996 by Karen Staser. It currently offers an online museum, educational programs, scholarship and research.

History 
The National Women's History Museum was founded in 1996 by Karen Staser. It currently curates online exhibitions and provides educational materials for school. NWHM hoped to build a permanent museum dedicated to displaying the collective history of American women on or near the National Mall in Washington, D.C.

Beginning in 2002, NWHM attempted to lease the annex of the Old Post Office on Pennsylvania Avenue, but this effort did not come to fruition.

As of June 2017, the museum maintains a presence online through social media and a comprehensive website which hosts many online exhibits where visitors can learn about the history of American women. The website also serves as a platform to promote NWHM's mission and generate support.

In spring 2020, NWHM launched Women Writing History: A Coronavirus Journaling Project, an initiative "designed to ensure that women and girls’ unique voices and experiences are not left out of the telling of the COVID-19 story. Through this project, women and girls of all ages can participate through the simple act of recording their daily thoughts and experiences during this time in order to document the impact of the coronavirus pandemic on women’s lives." NWHM received more than 500 submissions, both digital and print, and published them in a searchable microsite on October 21, 2021. On April 21, 2022, the New York Times published excerpts from NWHM's journaling project: "The result, after almost two years and 500 entries, is a rich Gestaltian time capsule of the pandemic, parts of it housed on the museum’s website or archived in the cabinets of its office in Alexandria, Va. There are handwritten and typed-up poems; voice notes between friends who live far apart; an interpretive dance recorded in a solitary bedroom; even a hand-stitched quilt. These physical and digital artifacts brim with emotion and reflection."

In late 2020, Congress passed legislation (P.L. 116-330, signed into law on January 13, 2021) directing the U.S. Mint to consult with the National Women's History Museum, as well as the Smithsonian Institution American Women’s History Initiative and the Bipartisan Women’s Caucus, to identify prominent American women to honor on a series of quarter dollars over four years beginning in January 2022. The women are featured on circulating and numismatic American Women Quarters™ Program coins. The public was invited to submit recommendations through a web portal hosted by NWHM, and more than 11,000 recommendations were submitted for consideration.

In 2022, the National Women's History Museum announced a partnership with DC Public Library. In Spring 2023, the NWHM will open their first full in-person exhibition at the Martin Luther King Jr. Memorial Library in Washington, D.C. The exhibit will trace Black feminism in Washington, DC from the turn of the 20th century through the civil rights and Black Power movements to today. The exhibit is curated by historians Sherie M. Randolph and Kendra T. Field and will focus on the stories and voices of Black feminist organizers and theorists, including Anna Julia Cooper, Eleanor Holmes Norton, Mary Treadwell, and Nkenge Touré. The exhibit will be located on the MLK Library's first floor. 

In October 2022, Glass Ceiling Breaker, was installed at the Martin Luther King Jr. Memorial Library as part of the partnership with DC Public Library. Glass Ceiling Breaker was commissioned by NWHM, Chief and BBH USA , with production assistance from M ss ng P eces, to "commemorate the iconic moment when Vice President Kamala Harris broke the glass ceiling by becoming the first woman, first Black person, and first Indian-American elected vice president of the United States. The installation was displayed in Washington, DC in February 2021 at the Lincoln Memorial. The project recently won three golds at the inaugural 2022 Anthem Awards, as well as a silver in Corporate Purpose & Social Responsibility (Outdoor) at the Cannes Lions International Festival of Creativity Awards 2021."

References

External links
 
 Women Writing History: A Coronavirus Journaling Project
 Crusade for the Vote

Proposed museums in the United States
1996 establishments in the United States
Women's museums in the United States